SB19 is a Filipino boy band that debuted in 2018, the pentad—consisting of members Pablo, Stell, Ken, Justin, and Josh. They were trained for 4 years by ShowBT Philippines, beginning in 2016. They are the first Filipino and Southeast Asian act to be nominated in Billboard Music Awards for the Top Social Artist category. They are also the first Southeast Asian act to enter the top 10 of Billboard Social 50 weekly and year-end charts. SB19 promotes its music as part of Pinoy pop (P-pop)—a popular sub-genre of Original Pilipino Music.

Name
The letters in the group name were from the initials of their Korean management company, ShowBT. The number 19 is derived from the country calling codes of South Korea (+82) and of the Philippines (+63)- the difference of 82 and 63, and the sum of the digits (8 + 2 + 6 + 3). It symbolized the collaboration of the two countries in the formation of the group. The members themselves, however, used the phrase "Sound Break"—for the goal to "break into the music scene" and improve the quality of Philippine boy groups.

History

2016–2018: Formation and early years 

SB19 was formed by ShowBT Philippines, the Philippine subsidiary of ShowBT Group in Korea. After the members were selected from hundreds of auditionees during a talent search in 2016, they underwent the same type of training provided to K-pop idols. They were supposed to be performers only on the company's events and activities but former CEO Geong Seong Han decided to launch them as a boy group. The group debuted with Josh, Pablo, Stell, Ken, and Justin on October 26, 2018, with the ballad single "Tilaluha". However, their initial efforts at promotions, mostly in schools and malls, were met with a "lukewarm reception".

2019: "Go Up" and rising popularity 

SB19's second single "Go Up" was released on July 19, 2019. Pablo described the song as their "last shot" because they had decided to disband if their career did not progress after. Unexpectedly, they gained public attention after the dance practice video of the song was uploaded which was later shared by a fan on Twitter and Facebook. Opportunities opened and the group started to appear in multiple radio and television outlets, both local and internationally. On December 22, they embarked on their first-ever nationwide 10 city concert tour titled SB19: Get in the Zone, as a follow-up promotion after becoming viral.

On November 20, 2019, SB19 became the first Filipino act to appear on the Billboard Next Big Sound chart. They also became the first Filipino act to enter the Billboard Social 50, debuting at number 28 on the week of December 28, 2019. Jeff Benjamin of Billboard noted that a growing international fanbase had aided their appearance in the chart. He added that "more artists [will] continue to look East for inspiration and a larger audience". Forbes remarked that the localization of ShowBT of the K-pop model is not unique, but SB19 is the first in the Philippines to succeed due to their strategic use of social media—the main factor of SB19's Social 50 chart appearance.

On December 25, Sony Music Philippines announced that SB19 had signed a recording contract with them, and on the same day, the group released their third single, "Alab (Burning)", under the new record label.

2020: Get in the Zone 
On March 9, 2020, SB19 has been added to the roster of artists of Spotify's RADAR Program, which supports new artists through marketing campaigns. The quintet released their debut album Get in the Zone, featuring nine tracks, including three released singles and two unreleased tracks, on July 31, 2020. Two weeks after the release of the album, SB19 achieved its highest position on the Social 50 chart at number two on the week of August 15. A week later, the group peaked at number five on the Emerging Artist chart.

On November 21, they held their first-ever online concert streamed live via the platform Global Live. It was later re-broadcast on November 28 as a fundraiser event for the communities affected by recent typhoons.

On December 3, SB19 appeared at number six on Billboard Year-End Social 50 chart, making them the first Southeast Asian act to reach the top 10 of the magazine's annual chart.

2021–2022: Pagsibol 

The group released "What?" on March 9, 2021, as the first single off their upcoming extended play, initially planned to be released in June 2021. On April 24, their first-ever fashion collection, in collaboration with Chynna Mamawal, was released that featured two limited premium sets, shirts, and dresses, all inspired by the single.

On April 29, SB19 became the first Filipino and Southeast Asian act to be nominated in Billboard Music Awards for Top Social Artist along with BTS, Blackpink, Ariana Grande, and Seventeen—which BTS won. It marked the first-ever appearance of a Filipino artist in the Billboard Music Awards.

Their second pre-release single, "Mapa", was released on May 16, 2021, as a tribute to parents. A band version in collaboration with Ben&Ben was released on June 27, 2021. Their first extended play Pagsibol was then released on July 22, 2021.

On August 1, the group held their first concert in 2021, titled Back in the Zone streamed online on KTX and became the top-selling concert on the platform. SB19 performed in the Forte: A Pop Orchestra Concert on October 17 with the SSC Chamber Choir, Battig Chamber Orchestra, and 4th Impact for the benefit of Sr. Baptista Battig Music Foundation scholars.

On October 21, SB19 was nominated as Best Southeast Asia Act at the 2021 MTV Europe Music Awards.

On November 4, "Bazinga" entered the newly-launched Billboard Hot Trending Songs at number 14 for the 24-hour and number 20 on the weekly. SB19 is the first Filipino artist to debut a track on the chart.

On December 16, National Commission for Culture and the Arts appointed SB19 as new Youth and Sentro Rizal ambassador. As part of the celebration of their 3rd anniversary, SB19 released a 6-episode series featuring the group members each, released on WeTV and YouTube. They also held the SB19 2021: Our Zone Third Anniversary Concert on December 18 and 19 streamed live online and later released on WeTV.

On the week of December 11, "Bazinga" reached number one on the Hot Trending Songs. It later becomes the song with the most weeks at number one on the chart surpassing six weeks run of "Butter".

On January 9, 2022, the group performed for their first international music festival, representing the Philippines at the 2021 ASEAN-Korea Round Festival with the goal of sharing cultures within the ASEAN region.
On March 16, 2022, they attended the Expo 2020 and performed at Dubai Exhibition Centre, marking SB19's first international live performance.

On April 10, 2022, two years during which most live activities have not been allowed because of the COVID-19 pandemic, SB19 headlined the first-ever P-pop Convention (PPOP Con) at Araneta City.

On April 23, 2022, SB19 held their first paid live solo concert at Araneta Coliseum hosted by Dunkin' Philippines.

On June 28, 2022, SB19 lands spots on Twitter Philippines "#WorldMusicDay" 2022 lists. The group was able to snag the top spot in the Top Music-Related Handles in the Philippines and the Top Hashtags Around Music in the Philippines lists on Twitter from May 31 to June 1. It was revealed during the celebration of Fête de la Musique (World Music Day), which aims to laud artists and communities locally and in South East Asia.

On July 5, Ken performed his newest solo single, "Bulan", at The Recording Academy Grammy's online series Global Spin, which celebrates global music, international artists, and the world's sounds. He is the first Filipino act to be featured in the said online series.

On July 31, SB19 opened the Binibining Pilipinas 2022 Coronation Night with the pageant's theme song, "Win Your Heart". The theme song was originally written by the legendary composer Dero "Nonong" Pedero in 1999. It was last given a new sound by Ballad King Martin Nievera in 2013 for Binibining Pilipinas' 50th Year. SB19 freshen up the tune. Being the first P-pop group to give the most significant change, they added rap lines in SB19's signature style. It gives the classic sung parts their interpretation, bringing the song firmly into the realm of P-Pop.

2022–present: "WYAT (Where You At)" 

On August 1, at the stroke of midnight, the social media page of SB19 shared an image of their logos with static interference and glitches. It is also a signal that the group is gearing up for something new.

For the first week of August, SB19 has been teasing its comeback. On August 12, SB19 released the single comeback title "WYAT (Where You At)", a disco-pop song that highlights the urgency of disconnection to reconnection of the times that should be releasing on September 2 with an official music video and a global concert tour named Where You At Tour will kickoff in Manila on September 17 in Araneta Coliseum. The group's social media, especially Twitter, has erupted over the last few days after the boy group released a series of cryptic riddles and videos that led fans to speculate about a world tour. As a result, the hashtag #WhereIsSB19 has been trending on Twitter worldwide daily. SB19 released their final video of the series announcing that the single and tour will be launched in September. Few cities in the Philippines were included on the tours after Quezon City Metro Manila. Clark City will be the next location, then Cebu City and Davao City. Singapore, the United Arab Emirates, and the United States were also included on the comeback concert tour list.

On August 31, SB19 was among the "Preview's 50 Most Influential for 2022". An annual selection by Summit Media's "Preview Magazine" honoring individuals and groups that have made the biggest impacts in different fields across the realms of fashion, beauty, and art, these faces have maximized their digital platforms to champion the innate diversity of the Filipino identity.

On September 23, the boy band SB19 was on the list of "The 100 Most Powerful People in the Philippines: Wielders of Soft Power" by the Esquire Magazine. The 100 people named were a selection of people from different industries of private and public organizations who embody power: authority, control, and influence.

On October 10, JCI Batangas awarded SB19 as the "2022 Outstanding Filipino Gamechanger" on the 3rd Gawad Balisong. The JCI Batangas Gawad Balisong recognizes the diverse lineup of individuals who made a notable influence on the members of the local organization and the community in the Philippines. It is a selection of Filipino game-changers who are motivated individuals who lead to a shift when they are thinking or doing things. They are authentic human beings who empower the community through their humble causes and stories of good.

On November 4, SB19 made their first live guesting on a US TV show, on Fox 5's morning show "Good Day New York". The group performed their hit single "WYAT (Where You At)".

On November 17, SB19 returned to Billboard's Hot Trending Songs with their new track "Where You At". Debuted ranked No. 17, the retro upbeat track ranked goes up to No. 4 before midnight. "WYAT (Where You At)" is the second SB19 song to place in the same Billboard list following "Bazinga", which set the record for most weeks at No. 1 in the Hot Trending Songs chart.

Artistry

Influences
SB19 has cited second-generation boy groups for inspiration, such as B2ST and Big Bang as well as third-generation boy groups: VIXX, GOT7, and BTS. Despite their apparent love for Korean music trickling down to their own body of work, SB19 admit they weren't always eager to ride the K-pop wave. Josh was exposed to BoA because of their dancing skills. His music inspirations are GD, Loonie, Gloc-9, Shanti Dope, and Smugglaz. Pablo's inspirations are Filipino hip-hop artist Loonie and Gloc-9. He also admires the style of Bigbang's G-Dragon, Ez Mil, Eminem, and NF, an American rapper, singer, and songwriter. He is a strong point of his group and the modern music industry. Stell's music inspiration is VIXX. He proudly notes some OPM veterans like Morissette and Sarah G who shaped their musical appreciation. Ken's inspirations are Daniel Caesar, a Canadian singer and songwriter, Filipino rock band IV of Spades, and Filipino rapper Al James. He admires Japanese rock band One Ok Rock and EXOs soloist Kai. Justin was inspired by the music of Filipino singer-songwriter Michael Pangilinan and GOT7.

Legacy and cultural impact 
While Filipino boy and girl groups had been around before SB19, the boy band is credited for "paving the way" for the launch of other music groups displaying a similar level of training, skill, and talent.

Culture
On December 16, 2021, The National Commission for Culture and the Arts (NCCA), the official government agency for culture in the Philippines under the Office of the President of the Philippines has named SB19 as its newest Youth and Sentro Rizal ambassadors representing Filipino culture and stories in the global scene. The NCCA lauded the group for genuine care for advocacies that uplift the Filipino spirit, music, and culture to the global scene, which is in line with the NCCA's mandate to promote Philippine arts and culture worldwide. Sentro Rizal (SR), the Philippines' cultural center for overseas Filipinos was formally established by the NCCA on June 28, 2011 with 36 offices worldwide.

Fandom 
In October 2019, the five-piece group revealed their official logo which represents the group's struggles, aspirations, and the people behind their success. In the same month, the boys also dropped their official color which is sky blue which represents the boys' confidence and sincerity.

In November 2019, SB19 unveiled in a Facebook Live video their official fandom name. The group revealed that their fandom name is A'TIN, which is pronounced as "eighteen" and in Tagalog it pronounce "Atin" meaning "ours". According to Pablo, the leader of the group, he explained in the Facebook Live video that SB19 wouldn't have been possible without their fanbase. He said,

When A'Tin, the official fandom name, was introduced by SB19, it immediately became an identity-defining moment. Language is a naming practice, and if a group of people is named in a particular way, the people begin to think and act according to the demand of the name. But such naming only becomes successful because there is agreement (not always mutual, unfortunately) between the "namer" and the "named". Pablo asked everyone to stop adding "s" to "A'Tin" because it is a collective noun. It is an irresistible, brilliant name-making strategy, especially because it crystallized an idea which the fans have been floating all along: SB19 represents their dreams and struggles in life, and every victory in the process feels like it is everyone's victory. Finally, they say, there is a Filipino boy group which they can be proud of and dream of seeing do well internationally. The A'Tin are SB19, and SB19 are the A'Tin.

Philanthropy 
SB19 is known for generosity. On January 12, 2020, when Taal Volcano erupted, the group launched a relief operation to help the eruption victims. On the 5th Wish 107.5 Music Awards, the group won and donated ₱200,000 to their chosen beneficiary, Autism Society Philippines (ASP). On November 28, 2020, SB19 rebroadcast their first-ever virtual concert "Global Live" for Monsoon Relief to raise funds for the communities affected by Super Typhoon Rolly and Typhoon Ulysses.

On October 17, 2021, the group headlined a virtual concert for the benefit of the Baptista Music Foundation, named after Sister Baptista Battig, Order of Saint Benedict (OSB), who was the founder of the Conservatory of Music of Saint Scholastica's College. The foundation's vision is to promote a nation culturally developed and united through music and serve as a catalyst for gifted underprivileged youth, and SB19 agreed to perform in this special concert to raise funds for the music scholars that the foundation is supporting.

On January 5, 2022, through the Stan World "Donations S2 Launching Event", a U.S. based app where fans can party and win rewards for their stars, their fans donated ₩1,820,000 to Save the Children Korea (세이브더칠드런) in SB19 name.

Endorsements and awards

On December 3, 2020, SB19 appeared at number six on Billboard Year-End Social 50 chart, making them the first Southeast Asian act to reach the top 10 of the magazine's annual chart. On April 29, 2021, SB19 became the first Filipino and Southeast Asian act to be nominated in Billboard Music Awards for Top Social Artist along with BTS, Blackpink, Ariana Grande, and Seventeen. It marked the first-ever appearance of a Filipino artist in the Billboard Music Awards. On November 4, "Bazinga" entered the newly-launched Billboard Hot Trending Songs at number 14 for the 24-hour and number 20 on the weekly. SB19 is the first Filipino artist to debut a track on the chart.

On October 21, 2021, SB19 has been nominated as Best Southeast Asia Act at the 2021 MTV Europe Music Awards.

On July 19, 2022 SB19 joined the biggest name on the Teen Vogue as one of the Best Boy Bands Of All Time. SB19 is the only Filipino act on the list composed of 33 bands across different genres and generations.

On July 20, 2022 SB19 fandom "A'TIN" ends up 2nd in Billboard Fan Army Face-Off championship round against "STAY", the fandom of K-pop boyband Stray Kids. The two groups outlasted 62 other vocal fan groups. The Billboard Fan Army Face-Off past champions include two-time winners Super Junior's E.L.F (two times), three-time clinchers T-ara's Queens (three times), and Big Bang's VIPs.

On October 10, 2022, JCI Batangas awarded SB19 as the "2022 Outstanding Filipino Gamechanger" on the 3rd Gawad Balisong. The JCI Batangas Gawad Balisong recognizes the diverse line up of Filipino gamechangers who are motivated individuals who lead to a shift whey they are thinking or doing things. They are authentic human beings who empower the community through their humble causes and stories of good.

On October 12, 2022, SB19 received an International Chartbursting Award, a special award on the 13th Star Awards for Music by the Philippine Movie and Press Club. The award was given to an artist that successfully penetrated and was on the rise in selling music internationally.

On November 23, 2022, SB19 won 7 awards at the Awit Awards 2022.

Endorsements

Members
 Josh  lead rapper & sub-vocalist
 Pablo  leader, main rapper & vocalist
 Stell  main vocalist & lead dancer
 Ken  lead vocalist & main dancer
 Justin  sub-vocalist, main visual & creative director

Discography

 Get in the Zone (2020)

Filmography

Films
EX-MAS (2020)
Our Zone Anniversary Series (2021)

Music Video
 Tilaluha (2018)
 Go Up (2019)
 Alab (Burning) (2020)
 "Ikako (Ikaw at Ako)" (2020)
 Hanggang sa Huli (2020)
 What? (2021)
 Mapa (2021)
 Mapa band version (2021) (ft. Ben&Ben)
 Win your heart (2021)
 Bazinga (2021)
 No stopping you (2021)
 Kabataang Pinoy (2021)
 Ligaya (2021)
 SLMT (2021)
 WYAT (Where You At) (2022)
 Nyebe (2022) (visualizer)

Online shows
Show Break! (2019–present)
SB19 School Buddies (2022–present)
SB19 Vlogs (2022–present)

Concerts tours

Headlining tours
Where You At Tour (2022)

References

External links

 

 
Filipino boy bands
Filipino pop music groups
ShowBT Entertainment artists
Musical groups from Metro Manila
Musical groups established in 2018
2018 establishments in the Philippines
Sony Music Philippines artists
English-language singers from the Philippines
Musical quintets
Vocal quintets